Redcloud Peak is a mountain peak of over fourteen thousand feet in the U.S. state of Colorado.  It is located in the San Juan Mountains in Hinsdale County approximately 7 miles (11 km) south west of Lake City.

Historical names
Red Mountain
Redcloud Peak – 1906

See also

List of mountain peaks of Colorado
List of Colorado fourteeners

References

External links

 
Redcloud Peak at Colorado Fourteeners Initiative

San Juan Mountains (Colorado)
Mountains of Hinsdale County, Colorado
Fourteeners of Colorado
North American 4000 m summits
Mountains of Colorado